Khayelihle Mathaba was a South African royal and politician. He was a KwaZulu-Natal MLA and the chieftain of the eMacambini.

He died in a traffic collision on August 9, 2014.

References

Year of birth missing
2014 deaths
South African politicians